Levski Ridge ( \'hre-bet 'lev-ski\) is the central ridge of the Tangra Mountains, Livingston Island. Its summit, Great Needle Peak rises to 1,680m and is the second highest summit of the island after Mount Friesland.

The ridge extends nearly 8 km between Shipka Saddle to the west and Devin Saddle to the east, and the same distance between Cherepish Ridge to the north and Christoff Cliff to the south. It is bounded by Huron Glacier to the north, Iskar Glacier to the northeast, Macy Glacier and Boyana Glacier to the southwest, and Srebarna Glacier and Magura Glacier to the southeast.

The ridge takes its name from Levski Peak. Remark: The name form ‘Great Needle’ has become established in usage for the ridge's summit, with ‘great’ considered more appropriate than the adjective ‘false’ in its Spanish name form ‘Pico Falsa Aguja’ as this major peak is hardly associated with the ‘true’ Needle Peak (Pico Aguja), a sharp black peak of elevation just 370 m situated near Samuel Point 8 km away.

Location

Maps
 L.L. Ivanov et al. Antarctica: Livingston Island and Greenwich Island, South Shetland Islands. Scale 1:100000 topographic map. Sofia: Antarctic Place-names Commission of Bulgaria, 2005.
 L.L. Ivanov. Antarctica: Livingston Island and Greenwich, Robert, Snow and Smith Islands. Scale 1:120000 topographic map.  Troyan: Manfred Wörner Foundation, 2009.  
 L.L. Ivanov. Antarctica: Livingston Island and Smith Island. Scale 1:100000 topographic map. Manfred Wörner Foundation, 2017.

Notes

References
 Levski Ridge. SCAR Composite Gazetteer of Antarctica
 Bulgarian Antarctic Gazetteer. Antarctic Place-names Commission. (details in Bulgarian, basic data in English)

External links
 Levski Ridge. Copernix satellite image

Tangra Mountains
Ridges of Antarctica